Sunlight Peak is located in the Absaroka Range, Shoshone National Forest in the U.S. state of Wyoming. Sulphur Glacier is situated on the east and northeast slopes of the peak.

References

Mountains of Park County, Wyoming
Shoshone National Forest